Walter Stern (born 6 February 1972, Innsbruck) is an Austrian male skeleton racer, who took part in the 2005/2006 Skeleton World Cup trying to qualify for the 2006 Winter Olympics. He was Champion of Europe in 2003.

World Cup 2005/2006 Results 
25th on November 10, 2005, Calgary CAN
23rd on November 17, 2005, Lake Placid, New York, USA

References

1972 births
Living people
Austrian male skeleton racers
Sportspeople from Innsbruck